OnMyRadio is R&B singer-songwriter Musiq Soulchild's fifth studio album. It was released on December 9, 2008.

The album entered the Billboard 200 chart at number 11, selling 91,498 copies its first week. It entered the Billboard Top R&B/Hip-Hop Albums chart at number 82 through street sales and, in its second week, jumped to number 1. The song samples Soulchild's previous hit Teachme.

Singles
The first single to be taken from the album was "Radio". It was sent to US radio stations in August 2008, and charted on Billboard's Hot R&B/Hip-Hop songs chart.

The album's second single, "IfULeave", was released to radio in October 2008.

The third single was "SoBeautiful".

Track listing

Personnel

Nick Banns – Assistant Engineer
Ivan "Orthodox" Barias – Audio Production, composer, Drum Programming, engineer, Instrumentation, Keyboards, producer, Programmer, Programming, Various Instruments
Adam Blackstone – Guitar (Bass)
Mary J. Blige – Featured Artist, Primary Artist, Vocals
Bruce Buechner – Engineer, Mixing
Joi Campbell – Arranger, composer, Vocal Arrangement
Sandra Campbell – Project Coordinator
Warryn Campbell – Arranger, Audio Production, composer, Instrumentation, producer, Programming, Various Instruments, Vocal Arrangement, Vocals (Background)
Terrence Cash – Engineer
Dru Castro – Audio Production, composer, engineer, producer
Curt Chambers – Guitar
Corey Church – Composer
Sean Cooper – Sound Design
Eric Dawkins – Arranger, composer, Vocal Arrangement
Antonio Dixon – Composer
Bojan Dugich – Vocal Recording
Euforo Ebong – Audio Production, composer, producer
Allen L. Irvin III -Vocals
James Fauntleroy – Arranger, composer, Vocal Arrangement
Rick Friedrich – Audio Engineer
Lanre Gaba – A&R
Marvin Gaye – Composer
Chris Gehringer – Mastering
Larry Gold – Strings
Victor Jason Greig – Executive Producer
Kairi Guinn – Composer
Carvin "Ransum" Haggins – Arranger, Audio Production, composer, engineer, producer, Vocal Arrangement
Home Cookin' – Audio Production
Adrian Hood – Vocals
J.R. Hutson – Audio Production, Keyboards, producer, Programming
Lee Hutson, Jr. – Composer
Jaycen Joshua – Mixing
John Lawson – Composer, Drums
Buddy Jones – Composer
Anika King – Art Manager
Jason Kingsland – Assistant Engineer

Jamie Knight – Vocals
Labrats – Vocal Arrangement
The Labratz – Arranger
John Lawson – Composer, Drums
Kevin Liles – Executive Producer
Glen Marchese – Mixing
Damian Marley – Composer, Featured Artist, Primary Artist
Danny Miller – Art Direction, Design
Wayne Moore – Bass Instrument, Bass
Mark Morales – Composer
PJ Morton – Arranger, composer, Vocal Arrangement
Musiq Soulchild – Arranger, Audio Production, composer, Executive Producer, Mixing, Primary Artist, Vocal Arrangement, Vocals (Background)
Renaldo Nehemiah – Stylist
Kristal Oliver – Vocals
Kristal "Tytewriter" Oliver – Guitar
Dave Pensado – Mixing
Miguel – Arranger, composer, Vocal Arrangement
James Poyser – Audio Production, composer, Instrumentation, producer, Various Instruments
Nick Romei – Package Manager
Eric Rosseau – Engineer
BJ Sledge – Composer
John Smith – Guitar
Johnnie "Smurf" Smith – Composer, Instrumentation, Keyboards
John Stahl – Assistant Engineer, Audio Engineer, Mixing Assistant
Michael Stanton – Composer
Joi Starr – Composer
Leonard Jr. Stephens – Composer, Guitar, Keyboards, Pedal Steel, Pedal Steel Guitar
Tyrone Tellington – Composer
Eric Tribbett – Drums
Christopher Umana – Audio Production, composer, producer
Joel Whitley – Guitar
Corey Williams – Arranger, composer, Vocal Arrangement, Vocals
Charlie Wilson – Composer
Damon Wimbley – Composer
Joy Winans – Spoken Word, Dialogue
Peter Yang – Photography

Charts

Weekly charts

Year-end charts

References

External links
 

Atlantic Records albums
2008 albums
Musiq Soulchild albums